Darediablo is an instrumental rock trio from New York City. They are influenced by 1970s heavy metal bands such as Black Sabbath and AC/DC, their bassist/guitarist often wearing an AC/DC T-Shirt. Their catalog of music have all been independent releases on Orchard starting in 2000, with their latest being released on Southern Records main label (2003).

History
Darediablo started in 2000 with Jake Garcia (bass guitar), Matthew Holford (Fender Rhodes, organ), and Peter Karp (drums). They later changed drummers after their Sky Cohete/Subaquatico double-EP, enlisting Chad Royce for Bedtime Stories, and Feeding Frenzy, as well as for live performances. Jake Garcia also started to play double-neck bass/guitar combo for live performances, and played guitar in addition to bass on Bedtime Stories. For Feeding Frenzy, he played only guitar.

They contributed the song Shipping & Handling to the television show Queer Eye for the Straight Guy, for February 2004.

Description
Darediablo started out as a blend of hard rock, jazz, and stoner rock, but have managed to focus these sounds into a style that is particularly suited to the instruments: an undersized bass ("the Midget") played with nods to Jake's guitar heroes, a Fender Rhodes and Hammond Organ pumped through reams of effects and distortion, and a drummer.

Time Out New York has said, "darediablo is a smoking, sometimes atmospheric, bass-drum-organ trio that comes on like Medeski Martin & Wood with an MC5 fixation."

Discography

Albums
Tunnel of Fire (2000)
Sky Cohete/Subaquatico (2001)
Bedtime Stories (2002)
Feeding Frenzy (2003)
Twenty Paces (2005)

External links
 The Band's Website
 Southern Records – Catalog of the Band
 Southern Records – Future Tour Dates
 Rockslide – Catalog of live music for sale

American instrumental musical groups
Rock music groups from New York (state)
Musical groups from New York City
American musical trios
Musical groups established in 2000